Abdul Khan (Nepali: अब्दुल खान) is a Nepalese politician, belonging to the Janamat Party. He is currently serving as the member of the 2nd Federal Parliament of Nepal. In the 2022 Nepalese general election he was elected as a proportional representative from the Nepalese Muslims category. He is also currently serving as the Minister of Water Supply since 26 December 2022 in the Third Dahal cabinet.

References

Living people
Nepal MPs 2022–present
Year of birth missing (living people)